Boris Luc Lambert (born 10 April 2000) is a Belgian footballer who plays for K.A.S. Eupen as a centre-back and defensive midfielder.

Club career
Lambert was first featured in Eupen's senior squad in 2018, but did not make any appearances between 2018 and 2021. Lambert made his Belgian First Division A debut for Eupen on 25 July 2021 in a game against Club Brugge. He scored his first goal against Sint-Truiden on 14 August 2021.

Career statistics

References

External links
 

2000 births
Living people
Belgian footballers
Association football defenders
Eupen players
Belgian Pro League players